The 1888 United States presidential election in Indiana took place on November 6, 1888, as part of the 1888 United States presidential election. Voters chose 15 representatives, or electors to the Electoral College, who voted for president and vice president.

Indiana voted for the Republican nominee, Benjamin Harrison, over the Democratic nominee, incumbent President Grover Cleveland. Harrison won his home state by a narrow margin of 0.44%.

Results

See also
 United States presidential elections in Indiana

Notes

References

Indiana
1888
1888 Indiana elections